Ronald G. Sheppard was a member of the 37th Legislature in the Oklahoma House of Representatives, representing District 28 (consisting of mostly Seminole County). He ran against the District 28 Incumbent Ryan Kiesel in 2008 but lost.

Family
Ronald G. Sheppard was born in 1939 to Lula and Geary Sheppard in Wetumka, Oklahoma. After completing high school at Wetumka, Ron attended East Central in Ada, Oklahoma. It was there that he met and married Wanda Lee Woody of Seminole, Oklahoma.

Ron and Wanda Lee had two children, Nova Dawn Bivens of Shreveport, Louisiana and Michelle Simmons of Tulsa, Oklahoma. Their four grandchildren are Lindsey Granados, Grant Bivens, Jessie Simmons, and Jamaie Simmons, and their only great-grandchild (so far) is Jordon Simmons.

Ron retired from teaching in 1995 to be Wanda Lee's primary care giver after she was diagnosed with multiple sclerosis. Wanda Lee died in 2000.

Ron married Lequita Martin of Seminole.

References

External links
RonForHouse.com Official campaign website
Project Vote Smart - Ronald G. Sheppard - Biography Profile
Oklahoma Insider Candidate Profiles
Elect OK Oklahoma Voter Guide

Sources
http://www.ronforhouse.com
https://web.archive.org/web/20130622043630/http://okhouse.gov/

1939 births
Living people
People from Seminole, Oklahoma
People from Wetumka, Oklahoma
Republican Party members of the Oklahoma House of Representatives